Rigoberto Manuel Rivas Vindel (born 31 July 1998) is a Honduran professional footballer who plays as a midfielder or forward for Serie B club Reggina 1914 and the Honduras national team.

Club career

Early life
Rivas was born in Balfate, Honduras. As a young child, his mother left Honduras for Spain in search of a better future, but she was unable to gain employment. She then decided to move to Italy, where there she could establish herself, and Rivas left Honduras at the age of 11 to reunite with his mother. Rivas speaks both Spanish and Italian.

Prato
After brief stints with local Florence clubs, Fiorentina and Sestese, Rivas joined Lega Pro club Prato in 2013. He made his professional debut on 8 May 2016, in a 3–1 home victory over Savona in the league.

Internazionale
On 30 August 2016, Rivas joined Inter Milan on a season-long loan from Prato. He was a member of the under-19 team that won 2016–17 Campionato Nazionale Primavera, defeating Fiorentina 2–1 in the final.

He received his first call-up to Inter's first team for the final Serie A match of the season against Udinese on 28 May 2017 by Stefano Vecchi, who was the coach of the youth team as well as a caretaker for the first team. Rivas was an unused substitute in a 5–2 win. He made his non-competitive debut for the first team on 9 July 2017, in a preseason game against WSG Wattens. He was signed by Inter outright on 7 July.

Loan to Brescia
On 31 August 2017, he was signed by Serie B club Brescia on a season-long loan deal with an option to buy. On 10 September, he made his Serie B debut for Brescia as a substitute, replacing Matteo Cortesi in the 64th minute of a 1–0 away win over Parma. On 8 October, Rivas played his first match as a starter for Brescia, a 3–0 away defeat against Virtus Entella, he was replaced by Alessandro Martinelli in the 74th minute. On 20 October, he played his first entire match for Brescia, a 2–0 away defeat against Cremonese.

Loan to Ternana
On 21 July 2018, Rivas joined Ternana Calcio on loan until 30 June 2019. He made his debut in the second round of the Coppa Italia against Carpi and scored the second goal in a 2–0 win.

Loan to Reggina
On 2 September 2019, he joined Serie C side Reggina 1914 on loan. The following 23 November, Rivas scored his first goal in a 4–1 win against Rende. On 27 August 2020, Inter Milan and Reggina renewed the loan spell for another season after Reggina's promotion to Serie B.

Reggina
On 30 June 2021, he moved to Reggina on a permanent basis and signed a contract until 30 June 2025.

International career
In June 2017, Rivas received a call-up from Honduras national team and was included in the provisional roster for the 2017 CONCACAF Gold Cup, however he was dropped from the final squad. He did receive a call-up for friendlies against Paraguay and Brazil on 5 and 9 June 2019 and made his debut against Paraguay – as a starter – in a 1–1 draw.

In March 2021, Rivas played in the 2020 CONCACAF Men's Olympic Qualifying Championship and helped Honduras successfully qualify for the nation's fourth straight Olympic football tournament. On 2 July, he was included in the final 22-man squad for the tournament in Tokyo, Japan. He played in all three group stage matches and scored the winning goal in the second match against New Zealand.

Career statistics

Club

Honours
Internazionale Primavera
 Campionato Nazionale Primavera: 2016–17

Reggina
 Serie C: 2019–20

References

External links
 
 

1998 births
People from Colón Department (Honduras)
Living people
Honduran footballers
Honduras international footballers
Association football midfielders
A.C. Prato players
Inter Milan players
Brescia Calcio players
Ternana Calcio players
Reggina 1914 players
Serie B players
Serie C players
Honduran expatriate footballers
Expatriate footballers in Italy
Honduran expatriate sportspeople in Italy
Footballers at the 2020 Summer Olympics
Olympic footballers of Honduras